D-BOX Technologies Inc., informally known as D-BOX, is a publicly traded haptic motion technology company based in Longueuil, Quebec. The company designs and manufactures motion and haptic systems for entertainment, simulation, and training industries. As of July 2019, D-BOX seats were located at over 700 movie screens in 40 countries.

The company was founded in 1998. Sebastien Mailhot is the company's President and CEO.

History

D-BOX was originally founded in 1998 as a manufacturer of powerful subwoofers. Michel Jacques was the company's president and CEO. The company noticed customers were buying multiple subwoofers to place around seats to mimic a motion effect. The company decided to shift its focus to motion technology, and in 2001 released its first generation of D-BOX motion seating systems. The company initially focused on the theatrical-exhibition market rather than home consumers, due to the high cost of a single chair.

In 2009, Nikki Rocco, president of distribution at Universal Pictures, asked D-BOX to use its motion technology for the 2009 film Fast & Furious. The project was successful, and was considered a company milestone. Also in 2009, Canadian exhibition chain Cineplex opened its first D-BOX location. The company also began working with movie theater chain Cinemark International, expanding globally to install seats throughout Latin America.

In October 2018, the company entered the sports simulation market, and displayed a Formula 1 simulator at a sports conference in London.

In November, Variety announced that D-BOX was working to develop an amusement park ride based on Ubisoft's popular Rabbids title.

By July 2019, D-BOX seats were located at over 700 screens in 40 countries. In August, the company announced that Australian and New Zealand-based company Hoyts was installing D-BOX seats in its theaters. In October, the company announced it was partnering with India-based film chain PVR Cinemas to install its seats in Indian cinemas, and that the 2019 Indian action film War would incorporate the motion technology coding.

On April 1, 2020, the company announced that Sébastien Mailhot was taking on the role of President and CEO. In September, British simulation company Cranfield Simulations announced a $170,000 home Formula 1 simulator using D-BOX's suspension platform. In November, the company announced a lower cost chair designed for the home entertainment market. In December, the company announced it was working with gaming hardware manufacturer Cooler Master to produce a gaming chair featuring full-body haptic technology.

Products and services
D-BOX produces haptic (motion) effects programmed for visual and musical content, which are sent to a motion system integrated either within a platform, a seat, or various types of equipment. Its technology is used for various industries including movie theaters and other commercial entertainment; commercial training and simulation; and home entertainment, including home theaters, gaming and sim racing.

Movie theatres
D-BOX motion systems are present in more than 700 screens throughout 40 countries. The first feature film to have been encoded with D-BOX was Fast & Furious released on April 3, 2009 at the TCL Chinese Theatre, on Hollywood Boulevard in Los Angeles. As of January 2021, over 2,000 titles are coded in D-BOX.

Commercial entertainment
D-BOX is involved in various commercial entertainment industry media, including Virtual Reality, Theme Parks, and Simulation and Training.

Commercial simulation and training
D-BOX technology is used for simulation and training by companies including heavy equipment companies Caterpillar and John Deere, and commercial simulation company CM Labs Simulations.

Home entertainment
D-BOX Technologies first introduced its motion generating systems in 2001 to the home theater, Sim racing, Esports and PC gaming markets. The D-BOX system can be integrated within many different seats. For existing seating, motion can be added with the help of a D-BOX Motion Platform.

Exhibitors
Exhibitors installing D-BOX equipment in their theaters include:
AMC
Cinemark Theatres
Cineplex Entertainment
Hoyts
Maya Cinemas
 Ster-Kinekor
 D'Place Entertainment

Studios
D-BOX works with movie studios including:
 Paramount Pictures
 Universal Pictures
 Walt Disney Studios
 Warner Brothers
 Yash Raj Films

References

External links
 Official website

Companies based in Longueuil
Companies listed on the Toronto Stock Exchange
Simulator rides
1998 establishments in Quebec